Victoria L. Morgan is an American biomedical engineer who is a professor of neurology and radiology at Vanderbilt University. She makes use of functional magnetic resonance imaging to understand neural activation and function. Her research looks to quantify and understand the impact of epilepsy in the brain.

Early life and education 
Morgan's master's research involved the optimization of processing techniques for phase contrast in Magnetic Resonance Imaging (MRI). She continued to use MRI throughout her doctoral research, examining pulmonary circulation after the Fontan procedure.

Research and career 
Morgan joined the faculty at Vanderbilt University in 1999. Morgan makes use of functional MRI (fMRI) to understand the impacts of epilepsy on the brain. For people who suffer from temporal lobe epilepsy, Morgan believes that fMRI can be used to localize the focus of seizures and the networks of seizure propagation.

Through the use of fMRI, Morgan creates neuronal function network maps, allowing the brain circuitry to be viewed as a collection of nodes and edges. fMRI measures neuronal activity through changes of blood flow. By using diffusion-weighted MI, it is possible to monitor how water moves through white matter tracts. She has shown that the functional network maps of epileptic patients are different to those of healthy controls, and that the differences correlate with the severity and duration of the patient's epilepsy. She has shown that patients who have successful surgeries (i.e., their seizures decrease) show particular patterns in their function network maps, whilst others are much less likely to respond so positively to the surgical intervention. By monitoring the seizure associated neuronal networks Morgan is able to predict the recurrence of epilepsy. The combination of fMRI and MRI can be used to predict how patients may respond to different therapies, improving success rates. These data may help to identify biomarkers that can be used to treat and understand epilepsy.

Selected publications

References 

American biomedical engineers
Biomedical engineers
American women engineers
Wright State University alumni
Vanderbilt University faculty
Year of birth missing (living people)
Living people
American women academics